On the Move may refer to:

 On the Move (TV series), a 1975–1976 BBC television series
 On the Move (Donna Fargo album), a 1976 album by American country artist Donna Fargo
 On the Move (Bob Mover album), a 1978 album by American jazz artist Bob Mover
 On the Move (Nat Adderley album), a 1983 album by American jazz artist Nat Adderley
 "On the Move" (Barney & Friends)
 "On the Move", a 2001 single by Bart Claessen (Barthezz)
 "On the Move", a song by Mudvayne from By the People, for the People
 On the Move: A Life, the 2015 autobiography of Oliver Sacks
 On the Move (film), 1978 film by Adolf Winkelmann